Luis Peña may refer to:

 Luis Peña (actor) (1918–1977), Spanish actor
 Luis Peña (footballer) (born 1979), Chilean football midfielder
 Luis Peña (fighter) (born 1993), Italian-born American professional mixed-martial artist